Alberto Camerini (born May 16, 1951) is an Italian singer-songwriter and musician, who was commercially most active during the late-1970s and early-1980s.

Life and career 
Alberto Camerini was born in São Paulo, Brazil from Italian Jewish parents who had moved to South America a few years earlier. His parents moved back to Milan when Alberto was 11 years old. Camerini enrolled at the University of Milan, where he became friends with Eugenio Finardi, who introduced him to music; together with Eugenio Finardi, Camerini started two bands, "Il Pacco" and "L'Enorme Maria". Camerini became a proficient guitarist and he later did session work for musicians such as Patty Pravo, Stormy Six, Fausto Leali and Eugenio Finardi himself. 

Camerini started his solo career in 1976, with the single "Pane quotidiano" and three albums that proposed an original mix between rock and Brazilian music. In the eighties Camerini initiated a successful collaboration with lyrics author and record producer Roberto Colombo. Inspired by the Kraut rock movement that was dominant in Europe at the time, Camerini had a significant commercial success with a number of synthpop hits, particularly with the songs "Rock 'n' roll robot" and "Tanz bambolina". In 1984 Camerini participated to the Sanremo Music Festival where he finished 16th. Following the lukewarm reception to his 1986 album Angeli in Blue Jeans, Camerini took a break from music for about a decade. In 1995 Camerini reprised his career and recorded the album, Dove l'arcobaleno arriva.

Discography

Selected singles

1976 – Pane quotidiano
1977 – Gelato metropolitano
1978 – Sciocka
1980 – Sintonizzati con me
1980 – Serenella
1981 – Rock 'n' roll robot
1982 – Tanz bambolina
1982 – Questo amore
1983 – Computer capriccio
1984 – La bottega del caffè
1986 – Va bene così

Studio albums
1976 – Cenerentola e il pane quotidiano
1977 – Gelato metropolitano
1978 – Comici cosmetici
1980 – Alberto Camerini
1981 – Rudy e Rita
1982 – Rockmantico
1986 – Angeli in blue jeans
1995 – Dove l'arcobaleno arriva
2001 – Cyberclown
2005 – Kids Wanna Rock

References

External links

1951 births
Italian pop singers
Living people
Italian rock singers
Italian Italo disco musicians
Musicians from São Paulo
Singers from Milan
Italian new wave musicians
Brazilian emigrants to Italy